Expresso Bongo is a 1959 British drama musical film directed by Val Guest, shot in uncredited black & white Dyaliscope and starring Laurence Harvey, Cliff Richard, and Yolande Donlan. It is adapted from the stage musical of the same name, which was first produced on the stage at the Saville Theatre, London, on 23 April 1958.

In the film, Cliff Richard and the Shadows made their second screen appearance in a film released during 1959, the first being the much darker Serious Charge. The later film was made at Shepperton Studios, near London, with certain scenes shot on location in London's Soho district.

Plot
Laurence Harvey plays sleazy hustler Johnny Jackson, who is always on the lookout for fresh talent to exploit, while managing his hectic life with his stripper girlfriend, Maisie King (Sylvia Syms). Maisie is looking to find a better life in singing.

Jackson discovers a teenage singer named Bert Rudge, played by Cliff Richard, in an espresso coffee shop and sets about sending him along the rocky road to fame. He changes his name to Bongo Herbert and soon gets him a record deal and a relationship with an ageing American singing sensation Dixie (Yolande Donlan).

Johnny gets a meeting with Mr Mayer of Garrick Records and gets Maisie to phone him there pretending to be HMV records, this prompts Mr Mayer into giving Bongo a contract.

However, Bongo soon realises that his 50/50 contract, which he naively agreed with Johnny, is not as great as he thought it was, and breaks from Johnny's contract with help from international star Dixie Collins (because Bongo is still legally a minor).

Production
Director Val Guest engaged Kenneth MacMillan to choreograph the strip-club dancers who appear in the film. Struggling at Shepperton Studios to get them to dance and sing to playback at the same time, MacMillan complained, "It's the simplest routine. They may have looks, legs and tits, but they have no co-ordination."

At first, Laurence Harvey was undecided on the kind of accent he would give his character, so Guest told him he was 'part Soho, part Jewish, and part middle-class' and that it might be an idea to model him on the writer Wolf Mankowitz. Harvey arranged a couple of lunches with the unsuspecting Mankowitz to study the writer at close hand, so the character Johnny Jackson in the film sounds something like the writer of the film. Harvey's character sports a melange of accents including his own South African. Wolf Mankowitz appears in the film's opening credit sequence, wearing a sandwich-board bearing his writer credit.

Cast
 Laurence Harvey as Johnny Jackson
 Sylvia Syms as Maisie King
 Yolande Donlan as Dixie Collins 
 Cliff Richard as Bert Rudge/Bongo Herbert
 Meier Tzelniker as Mayer
 Ambrosine Phillpotts as Lady Rosemary
 Eric Pohlmann as Leon (as Eric Pohlman)
 Gilbert Harding as himself
 Hermione Baddeley as Penelope 
 Reginald Beckwith as Reverend Tobias Craven

Soundtrack album
The music for the 1959 film was produced by Norrie Paramor. With the exception of one song, it was entirely different from the music that was used in the 1958 musical. The music and the plot were rewritten to downplay the satire and showcase Richard and his band. In the best ironic traditions of Tin Pan Alley, a satire became a tribute. Only The Shrine on the Second Floor — a song that was intended to drive a sharpened stake into the heart of all sentimental ballads about mother – made it into the movie, but Richard sang it straight.

Soundtrack EP

Reception

According to Val Guest the film made "a lot of money and got us a lot of awards". Kine Weekly called it a "money maker" at the British box office in 1960. 

In a review for Radio Times, David Parkinson said that as well as being a fascinating snapshot of the era the film was also "one of the best musicals ever produced in this country." Laurence Harvey was "perfectly cast" as the talent agent and the script by Wolf Mankowitz was said to give the film an authentic quality. It was given a 4/5 rating.

Filmink magazine called it "a most likeable film (if you can handle Harvey’s accent)."

References

External links

http://www.doollee.com/PlaywrightsN/norman-monty.html Monty Norman plays

1959 films
1959 musical films
1950s satirical films
1950s English-language films
British musical films
British rock music films
Films directed by Val Guest
Films set in London
Films with screenplays by Wolf Mankowitz
1950s British films